The  were a series of four heavy cruisers built for the Imperial Japanese Navy in the late 1920s. Three were lost during World War II.

Their main armament were ten 20 cm/50 3rd Year Type naval guns in five twin turrets which were complemented by a heavy torpedo armament; at the time, this was the heaviest armament of any cruiser class in the world. They were also the first cruisers the Japanese Navy constructed that exceeded the (10,000 ton) limit set by the Washington Naval Treaty.

Design

The Myōkō class displaced , with a hull design similar to the preceding . Design endurance was 8,000 nautical miles, however the increased weight issues reduced it to 7,000.

Protection was superior to the preceding Aoba-class and accounted for about 16 percent of trial displacement. A  side belt that ran along  of the ship's length and  armored deck protected the magazine and machinery spaces and  protected the turret barbettes; however, the turrets had only 25mm splinter protection and the bridge was unarmored. Following innovations pioneered in Yubari, the armor belt was made an integral part of the hull structure to reduce weight. A torpedo bulkhead consisting of two  plates with a total thickness of  extended inwards from the bottom of the armor belt and curved to meet the bottom of the double hull.
As originally constructed, the class was armed with a main battery of ten  20 cm/50 3rd Year Type 1 GÔ naval guns mounted in 5 twin turrets, the heaviest armament of any heavy cruiser in the world at the time. Secondary armament initially were 12 cm/45 10th Year Type dual purpose guns in six single mounts. Short-range anti-aircraft defense was provided by two 7.7mm machine guns. Torpedo armament was unusually heavy compared to the cruisers of other nations at the time, with 12  carried in fixed single launchers inside the hull. They were also equipped with a single aircraft catapult and aircraft for scouting purposes.

Modernizations
The class was modernized twice before the outbreak of the Pacific War. The first modernization program, carried out between 1934–36, was the most extensive. The main armament was upgraded to the  2 GÔ versions and the 120mm guns replaced with eight 12.7 cm/40 Type 89 dual purpose guns in twin mounts. The single catapult was replaced with an aircraft deck that could accommodate three aircraft and two catapults. The fixed torpedo tubes in the hull were removed and two quadruple launchers carrying the Type 93 Long Lance torpedo were installed under the aircraft deck. The torpedo bulges were extended to increase stability. Anti-aircraft protection was increased to eight 13mm machine guns in two quadruple mounts.

The second modernization in 1939 added an additional two quadruple torpedo launchers and enhanced light anti-aircraft armament with the introduction of the Type 96 25mm gun. The aircraft catapults were upgraded to handle heavier floatplanes and the torpedo bulges were enlarged to increase stability.

The class would receive upgrades during the Second World War to reflect the growing threat of aircraft in the form of numerous Type 96 25mm gun and air and surface search radar, Myōkō eventually receiving 52 25mm autocannons in various single, double, and triple mounts. The two aft quadruple torpedo mounts were removed in 1944 to allow for the growing number of anti-aircraft armament.

Ships in class
The ships in the class were:

References

Notes

Books

External links

 CombinedFleet.com: Myōkō class cruisers
WW2 Cruisers: Myoko Class Heavy Cruiser

Cruiser classes
 
Ships built in Japan
Cruisers of the Imperial Japanese Navy